Pyramidobela is a genus of insects which is mostly placed in the family Oecophoridae. The genus was formerly included in the Ethmiidae.

Species
Pyramidobela agyrtodes (Meyrick, 1927)
Pyramidobela angelarum (Keifer, 1936)
Pyramidobela compulsa (Meyrick, 1931)
Pyramidobela epibryas (Meyrick, 1931)
Pyramidobela ochrolepra (Powell, 1973)
Pyramidobela quinquecristata (Braun, 1921)
Pyramidobela tetraphyta (Meyrick, 1931)

References

Oecophoridae